Prince Chun may refer to any of the following princely peerages of the Qing dynasty in China:

 Prince Chun (純), created in 1674
 Prince Chun (淳), created in 1709
 Prince Chun (醇), created in 1872